is a Prefectural Natural Park in western Tokushima Prefecture, Japan. Established in 1967, the park spans the borders of the municipalities of Miyoshi and Higashimiyoshi.

See also
 National Parks of Japan

References

Parks and gardens in Tokushima Prefecture
Protected areas established in 1967
1967 establishments in Japan
Miyoshi, Tokushima
Higashimiyoshi, Tokushima